The Spy with Ten Faces (aka / Upper Seven, the Man to Kill), or /The Man of a Thousand Masks) is a 1966 Italian-West German Eurospy film written and directed  by Alberto De Martino.

Plot
Paul Finney aka Upperseven; played by Paul Hubschmitt, is a master of disguise by the use of masks. His task is to secure a transport of credit money for the union of some African states. An international gang manages to steal this money and wants to use it to build a missile base. Part of the film takes place in Rome.

Cast
  Paul Hubschmid as Paul Finney, the Upperseven
  Karin Dor as CIA agent Helen Farheit
  Vivi Bach as Birgit
  Nando Gazzolo as Kobras
  Rosalba Neri as Pauline
  Guido Lollobrigida as Santos
  Tom Felleghy as Gibbons
  Tullio Altamura as Bank director

Release
The Spy with Ten Faces was released in West Germany on April 22, 1966.

References

External links

1966 films
1960s spy thriller films
1960s action films
Italian spy thriller films
Italian action films
1960s Italian-language films
Films directed by Alberto De Martino
German spy thriller films
German action films
West German films
1960s Italian films
1960s German films